The insurgency in Nagaland, in northeastern India, is an ongoing conflict fought between the ethnic Nagas and the governments of India. Nagaland inhabited by the Nagas is located at the tri-junction border of India on the West and South, north and Myanmar on the East.

"National Socialist Council of Nagaland (Khaplang)", which wants an independent "greater Nagaland" to also include territory now in Myanmar, based on ethnicity; and the "Naga National Council (Adino)".

The question of "Naga Sovereignty" was put to plebiscite on 16 May 1951. To defend themselves, the Naga after much deliberation formed the armed wing of NNC, came to be known as NSG (Naga Safe Guards) under Kaito Sukhai.

History
1946 saw the creation of the Naga National Council (NNC) under Phizo's leadership. The NNC leaders and the Governor of Assam, Sir Akbar Hydari, signed a Nine-Point Agreement which granted Nagas rights over their lands and legislative and executive powers. The judicial capacity of Naga courts were empowered and no law from the provincial or central legislatures could affect this agreement. Very significantly, the agreement included a clause demanding that the Nagas be brought into the same administrative unit at the earliest. However, one clause stipulated 

The Governor of Assam as the agent of the Government of India will have a special responsibility for a period of ten years to ensure that due observance of this agreement to be extended for a further period, or a new agreement regarding the future of the Naga people to be arrived at.

The interpretation of this clause has been contested between the Nagas and the Indian Government. To Nagas this clause meant independence from India at the end of the ten-year period. To the India Government this clause meant making a new agreement after the ten-year period if the present agreement did not address Naga issues sufficiently. Phizo rejected the Nine-Point Agreement to who the agreement fell short of dealing with the issue of Naga sovereignty. The NNC under Phizo's leadership declared Naga independence on 14 August 1947 and with success propagated the idea of Naga sovereignty throughout the Naga tribes. A Naga plebiscite was organised on 16 May 1951. The Naga struggle remained peaceful in the 1940s and early 1950s.

The Naga insurgency, climaxing in 1956, was an armed ethnic conflict led by the Naga National Council (NNC) which aimed for the secession of Naga territories from India. The more radical sectors of NNC created the Federal Government of Nagaland (FGN) which also included an underground Naga Army.

The insurgency witnessed a new spark in 2021 when fourteen innocent citizens of Nagaland while returning to their homes after a day long work from the coal mines were ambushed and killed by the Indian Army Soldiers of the 21 Para Special Forces army unit. The killings led to wide ranging protests to hold the soldiers accountable and asked for repealing of the Armed Forces Special Power Act. The Act commonly known as AFSPA was enacted in the state in 1958 by central government of India which authorizes soldiers of the armed forces to shoot any suspected individual without formal orders from any superior civilian authority.

Rebel groups 
Several rebel groups have operated in Nagaland since the mid-twentieth century, including the following:
 Naga National Council: a political organisation active in the late 1940s and early 1950s, which became separatist under Angami Zapu Phizo.
 Naga National Council (Adino) – NNC (Adino): the oldest political Naga organisation, now led by the daughter of Naga rebel A.Z. Phizo.
 National Socialist Council of Nagaland (Isak-Muivah): formed on 31 January 1980 by Isak Chishi Swu, Thuingaleng Muivah and S. S. Khaplang ADAMANT. They want to establish a ‘Greater Nagaland’ (‘Nagalim’ or the People’s Republic of Nagaland) based on Mao Tse Tung’s model.
 National Socialist Council of Nagaland (Khaplang): formed on 30 April 1988, its goal is to establish a ‘greater Nagaland’ based on ethnicity, comprising the Naga-dominated areas within India, and contiguous areas in Myanmar.
 Naga Federal Government: separatist movement active in Nagaland during the 1970s. After its leader was captured and the headquarters destroyed, NFG's activities decreased.
 Naga Federal Army: separatist guerrilla organisation active in the 1970s. Several hundred members of NFA reportedly have received training in China.

See also
 Nagaland Peace Accord
 List of massacres in Nagaland
 Asymmetric warfare
 National Liberation Front of Tripura
 People's war

References

External links
 Baptist Agenda for Peace in Nagalim, India 
"A remote land of jungle, Jesus – and religious war", Daily Herald, 5 May 2003
 "Peace talks an insult to Nagas", The Week, 9 February 2003.
 "Religious Fervor May Dominate Emerging Indian State of Nagalim", The Washington Diplomat, October 2003
 "The most Baptist state in the world—Nagaland—is vying to become a powerhouse for cross-cultural missions",  Christianity Today, 20 February.
"We want t penetrate China, Cambodia, Burma, Vietnam and Laos and Nepal with the Gospel", Christian Today (India), 29 August 2003.
 "Nagas want solution, not election" , Baptist Peace Fellowship of North America, February 1998
 "Church Backs Terrorism in the North-East", Ind Pride
 "Role of the Church – Charity or...?" , Vanvasi Kalyan Parishad
"Nagaland 1954", On War

Rebellions in India
20th-century conflicts
21st-century conflicts
History of Nagaland
Nagaland
Insurgencies in Asia